Calape, officially the Municipality of Calape,  is a 3rd class municipality in the province of Bohol, Philippines. According to the 2020 census, it has a population of 33,079 people.

Its name is derived from cape, referring to either a species of rattan or to the local varietal of coffee, Kape Barako, both of which still grow abundantly there to this day.

History

By the time Spaniards arrived, there was already a native settlement in Calape. In 1802, the Spanish governor of Cebu established it as an independent municipality.

In 1957, the barangay of Abucayan Norte was created from the sitios of Cabulihan and Cabinong, and the barangay of Abucayan Sur from the sitios of Rama and Bino. The sitios of Binogawan, Masonoy, Bentig, Cahayag, and Lawis were also constituted into barrios.

Geography

Calape is bounded by Loon in the west and Tubigon in the east. The jurisdiction of Calape includes the islands of Pangangan (eight barangays) and Mantatao, as well as two uninhabited islets, Poom Island and Basihan Island.

There are four rivers that flow through the territory: Tultugan and Liboron Rivers that drain into Calape Bay, and Calunasan and Abucayan Norte Rivers that drain into Tipcan Bay.

Most of the coastal area is a fairly level plain that gradually rises into rolling hills of coralline limestone.

Barangays

Calape comprises 33 barangays, of which 18 are coastal.

Climate

Demographics

Religion

92% of Calape's population is Roman Catholic. The remaining 8% is divided among other religious groups.

Economy

Gallery

Notable personalities

Yoyoy Villame, a novelty singer

References

External links

 [ Philippine Standard Geographic Code]
Municipality of Calape
Calape

Municipalities of Bohol